Ligonchio is a frazione of the comune (municipality) of Ventasso in the Province of Reggio Emilia in the Italian region Emilia-Romagna, located about  west of Bologna and about  southwest of Reggio Emilia.   It was an independent comune until 2016.

Cities and towns in Emilia-Romagna